David Vanegas (born 6 December 1986) is a Colombian professional golfer.

Vanegas was born in Medellín. He attended Johnson & Wales University in Florida, United States before turning professional in 2008 and joining the Tour de las Américas. In 2010 he won for the first time at the season opening Abierto Internacional de Golf II Copa Antioquia played on his home course at Club Campestre El Rodeo in Rionegro. The tournament was co-sanctioned by the European Challenge Tour and the Canadian Tour, and the win earned him exemptions on both of those tours.

Professional wins (2)

Challenge Tour wins (1)

1Co-sanctioned by the Tour de las Américas and the Canadian Tour

PGA Tour Latinoamérica wins (1)

Canadian Tour wins (1)

1Co-sanctioned by the Challenge Tour and the Tour de las Américas

Tour de las Américas wins (1)

1Co-sanctioned by the Challenge Tour and the Canadian Tour

Team appearances
Amateur
 Eisenhower Trophy (representing Colombia): 2006, 2008

References

External links

David Vanegas at the Tour de las Américas official site

Colombian male golfers
PGA Tour Latinoamérica golfers
European Tour golfers
Sportspeople from Medellín
1986 births
Living people
21st-century Colombian people